Mílton Lourenço Rosa Barros (born 21 June 1984) is an Angolan professional basketball player. He is also a member of the Angola national basketball team. Internationally, Barros has represented Angola on several occasions, including the 2006 Lusophony Games, 2006 FIBA World Championship, 2007 African Championship and the 2008 Summer Olympics.

He is married to former handball player Elzira Tavares and a brother of Petro Atlético football player Manucho Barros.

He is currently playing for Recreativo do Libolo at the Angolan major basketball league BIC Basket.

See also
 Angola national basketball team

References

External links
 

1984 births
Living people
People from Cabinda Province
Angolan men's basketball players
Basketball players at the 2008 Summer Olympics
Olympic basketball players of Angola
Atlético Petróleos de Luanda basketball players
C.R.D. Libolo basketball players
G.D. Interclube men's basketball players
Point guards
African Games gold medalists for Angola
African Games medalists in basketball
2014 FIBA Basketball World Cup players
2006 FIBA World Championship players
Competitors at the 2003 All-Africa Games